Russell City (also known as De Young or Deyoung) is an unincorporated community in Elk County, Pennsylvania, United States. Russell City had a post office until April 23, 2005; it still has its own ZIP code, 16728.

References

Unincorporated communities in Elk County, Pennsylvania
Unincorporated communities in Pennsylvania